The men's doubles of the 2017 Advantage Cars Prague Open tournament was played on clay in Prague, Czech Republic.

Julian Knowle and Igor Zelenay were the defending champions but only Zelenay chose to defend his title, partnering Andrej Martin. Zelenay lost in the first round to Christian Garin and Mariano Kestelboim.

Jan Šátral and Tristan-Samuel Weissborn won the title after defeating Gero Kretschmer and Andreas Mies 6–3, 5–7, [10–3] in the final.

Seeds

Draw

References

External Links
 Main Draw

Advantage Cars Prague Open - Men's Doubles
2017 Men's Doubles